Oglasa is a genus of moths in the family Erebidae. The genus was erected by Francis Walker in 1859.

Species
Oglasa annulisigna Hampson, 1926 Ghana
Oglasa ansorgei (Bethune-Baker, 1913) Angola
Oglasa apicalis (Leech, 1900) China (Zhejiang)
Oglasa arcuata (Fabricius, 1787) Sri Lanka
Oglasa aroa (Bethune-Baker, 1908) New Guinea
Oglasa atristipata Hampson, 1926 Ghana
Oglasa aulota Hampson, 1926 southern Nigeria
Oglasa auximena Viette, 1958 Madagascar
Oglasa basicomma Holloway Borneo
Oglasa bifidalis (Leech, 1889) Japan
Oglasa bisignata (Hampson, 1907) Sri Lanka
Oglasa calimanii Berio, 1939 Ethiopia
Oglasa chavanei Viette, 1965 Madagascar
Oglasa confluens Hampson, 1926 Transvaal
Oglasa connectens Hampson, 1926 Philippines (Luzon)
Oglasa contigua Wileman & West, 1929 Philippines (Luzon)
Oglasa costimacula Wileman, 1915 Taiwan
Oglasa costisignata Hamspon, 1926 Borneo
Oglasa defixa (Walker, 1862) Borneo
Oglasa dia (Viette, 1972) Madagascar
Oglasa diagonalis Hampson, 1926 Ghana
Oglasa diasticta Hampson, 1926 Borneo
Oglasa fulviceps (Hampson, 1894) Himachal Pradesh
Oglasa fuscitemrinata (Hampson, 1898) Sikkim
Oglasa griselda Hampson, 1926 Ghana
Oglasa hollandi Gaede, 1930 Sierra Leone
Oglasa holophaea (Hampson, 1926) southern Nigeria
Oglasa hypenoides (Moore, 1881) Meghalaya
Oglasa iselaea Viette, 1958 Madagascar
Oglasa junctisigna Hampson, 1926 New Guinea
Oglasa lagusalis Walker, [1859] Borneo
Oglasa maculosa (Walker, [1863]) Borneo
Oglasa mediopalens Wileman & South, 1917 Taiwan
Oglasa mediopallens Wileman & South, 1917
Oglasa microsema Hampson, 1926 Ghana
Oglasa muluensis Holloway Sarawak
Oglasa nana (Walker, 1869) Congo
Oglasa obliquilinea Hampson, 1926 New Guinea
Oglasa obliquisigna Hampson, 1926 Myanmar
Oglasa ochreobrunneata Viette, 1956 Madagascar
Oglasa ochreovenata (Bethune-Baker, 1906) New Guinea
Oglasa pachycnemis Hampson, 1926 Borneo
Oglasa parallela Hampson, 1926 Malawi
Oglasa phaeonephele Hampson, 1926 southern Nigeria
Oglasa plagiata Gaede, 1939 Cameroon
Oglasa prionosticha Turner, 1944 north-western Australia
Oglasa renilinea Gaede, 1949 East Africa
Oglasa retracta (Hampson, 1907) Sri Lanka
Oglasa rufimedia Hampson, 1926 Nigeria
Oglasa rufoaurantia Rothschild, 1915 Ceram
Oglasa separata (Walker, 1865) Northern India
Oglasa sordida (Wileman, 1915) Taiwan
Oglasa sordidula (Walker, 1864) Borneo, Singapore, Sumatra
Oglasa tamsi Gaede, 1939 Ghana, Cameroon
Oglasa tessellata Hampson, 1926 southern Nigeria
Oglasa trigona (Hampson, 1891) Nilgiri
Oglasa umbrosa (Wileman, 1916) Taiwan
Oglasa xanthorhabda Prout, 1926 Buru

References

Rivulinae
Noctuoidea genera